The 2007 Derby City Council election took place on 3 May 2007 to elect members of Derby City Council in England. One third of the council was up for election and the council stayed under no overall control.

The election saw the Conservative Party gain a seat in Chaddesden from the Labour Party. The Labour Party gained one in Darley from the Liberal Democrats. Following the election Labour continued to run the council after they and the Conservatives agreed to continue their agreement, with the Conservatives retaining 3 seats in the cabinet.

After the election, the composition of the council was:
Labour 24
Liberal Democrat 13
Conservative 12
Independent 2

Election result

Ward results

Abbey

Allestree

Alvaston

Arboretum

Blagreaves

Boulton

Chaddesden

Chellaston

Darley

Derwent

Littleover

Mackworth

Mickleover

Normanton

Oakwood

Sinfin

Spondon

References

2007 English local elections
2007
2000s in Derby